Mario Barbatti (born December 28, 1971) is a Brazilian physicist, computational theoretical chemist, and writer. He is specialized in the development and application of mixed quantum-classical dynamics for the study of molecular excited states. He is also the leading developer of the Newton-X software package for dynamics simulations. Mario Barbatti held an A*Midex Chair of Excellence at the Aix Marseille University between 2015 and 2019, where he is a professor since 2015.

Honors and awards 
2021: Fellow of the European Academy of Sciences.
2021: Senior member of the Institut Universitaire de France
2019: Opening lecture of the XX Brazilian Symposium of Theoretical Chemistry
2019: ERC Advanced Grant. Mario Barbatti has been the first Brazilian scientist and the first computational chemist in France to receive this award
2015: A*Midex Chair of Excellence

Scientific contributions, interests, and production 
By the end of 2019, Mario Barbatti had published over 150 scientific works, which had been cited about 7000 times (h-index 48).

Since 2007, Barbatti has been the leading developer of the Newton-X platform, a software collection for dynamics and spectrum simulations, using surface hopping and the nuclear ensemble approach. Using dynamics and other quantum chemical methods, his research has focused on the simulations of the ultrafast photochemistry and photophysics of organic molecules.

Among his main contributions, Barbatti, in collaboration with Hans Lischka, delivered a comprehensive map of the internal conversion channels of nucleobases. These results help to explain how DNA is stabilized after UV excitation.

Although Barbatti's research has been strongly oriented towards photoinduced processes in nucleic acids, he and his co-workers have contributed to many different sub-fields.

In 2013, in collaboration with Walter Thiel, they showed how UV irradiation can generate nucleobases out of inorganic components. Although this chemical reaction has been known since the 1960s, their work was the first one to unveil the exact reaction mechanism.

Barbatti also discovered a new internal conversion mechanism, allowing molecules quickly return to ground state. In this mechanism, a conical intersection between the ground and the excited electronic states is formed by an electron transfer from the solvent to the excited chromophore. This solvent-chromophore electron-transfer mechanism has been predicted to occur in 7H-adenine in water.

Barbatti and his colleagues at the Federal University of Paraiba have shown that CH...Cl hydrogen bonds can be formed in small molecules in the gas phase. This type of bond had previously been observed only in densely packed crystal structures.

He has also contributed on topics in organic photodevices, astrochemistry, and atmospheric photochemistry.

Currently, Barbatti and his team—the Light and Molecules group —are focusing on method developments, attempting to extend the excited-state simulation methods into the nanosecond regime. In a collaboration with Pavlo Dral and Walter Thiel, they implemented one of the first algorithms for nonadiabatic dynamics using machine learning.

Popularization and presence in the media 
Some of the main results from Barbatti's work have been picked by diverse news outlets. These media have dedicated special attention to his research on internal conversion of nucleobases, prebiotic reactions, and new chemical reactions and mechanisms. His work is also popularized through blog posts on his group website and YouTube channel.

References

External links 
 The Light and Molecules research group

1971 births
Living people
Brazilian scientists
Computational chemists
Theoretical chemists
Brazilian physicists
People from Petrópolis